John Thomas Peele (1822-1897) was a British painter specializing in portraits, landscapes, and genre scenes.

Born in Peterborough, Northamptonshire, Peele immigrated to America with his parents in about 1834. The family settled in Buffalo, New York, where Peele began painting. In 1840, he traveled to New York City to continue his artistic training and enrolled in the National Academy of Design's antique class. Peele remained in New York City for approximately eighteenth months and then settled in Albany, where he worked as a portrait painter for two years. From 1841 to 1844, Peele was in London attempting to launch a career as a society portraitist, but he failed to win substantial patronage. He returned to New York by 1845 and switched his focus to ideal genre subjects featuring children. The artist achieved some popularity with his sentimental compositions, eventually becoming a member of the National Academy of Design. In approximately 1851, he relocated to London. From 1852 to 1891, he exhibited at the Royal Academy, the British Institution, and the Society of British Artists, to which he was elected in 1872. During this period, his work was also featured in exhibitions held at the Royal Society of Artists in Birmingham and the Glasgow Institute of the Fine Arts. Although the artist kept a studio in London throughout the second half of his career, he spent extended periods in Liverpool, Douglas (Isle of Man), and Bexley Heath, Kent, where he maintained a second home after 1865. His career flourished during the last decades of his life. Prominent figures such as Prince Albert and the American landscape painter Frederick Edwin Church purchased several of his paintings and the dealers Messrs. Graves & Co. published engravings after his compositions.

Gallery

Notes 

1822 births
1897 deaths
People from Peterborough
19th-century British people
British male painters
19th-century American painters
19th-century British painters
19th-century British male artists